Roger Federer was the defending champion, but withdrew due to fatigue, after winning the 2009 French Open.

Tommy Haas won in the final 6–3, 6–7(4–7), 6–1, against Novak Djokovic.

Seeds

Draw

Finals

Top half

Bottom half

References

External links
Singles Draw
Qualifying Draw

Singles